The Veiled Woman is a 1929 American drama film directed by Emmett J. Flynn and starring Lia Torá, Lupita Tovar and Walter McGrail, also featuring Bela Lugosi. This film was initially advertised as being a sound film, but at the last minute, the producer decided to film it as a silent instead.

Plot
The film is told in flashbacks by a woman who tells a young girl four stories of men she knew in her past, one of whom she had been forced to kill in self defense.

Cast
 Lia Torá as Nanon  
 Paul Vincent as Pierre  
 Walter McGrail as Diplomatic Attaché  
 Josef Swickard as Col. De Selincourt  
 Lupita Tovar as Young Girl 
 Bela Lugosi as Nanon's murdered suitor
 Kenneth Thomson as Dr. Donald Ross  
 André Cheron as Count De Bracchi  
 Ivan Lebedeff as Capt. Paul Fevier  
 Maude George as Countess De Bracchi

References

Bibliography
 Pancho Kohner. Lupita Tovar The Sweetheart of Mexico. Xlibris Corporation, 2011.

External links

Stills at the Bela Lugosi blog

1929 films
1929 drama films
1920s English-language films
Films directed by Emmett J. Flynn
Fox Film films
Films set in Paris
American black-and-white films
1920s American films